Hans Gut (born 29 March 1950) is a sailor from Austria. Gut represented his country at the 1972 Summer Olympics in Kiel. Gut took 20th place in the Soling with Ronni Pieper as helmsman and Peter Gerber as fellow crew member.

References

Living people
1950 births
Swiss male sailors (sport)
Sailors at the 1972 Summer Olympics – Soling
Olympic sailors of Switzerland
20th-century Swiss people